Paolo Del Bianco (born August 2, 1945), is president of the Romualdo Del Bianco Foundation, member of the ICOMOS Hungary Committee, member of the ICOMOS International Scientific Committee for Theory and Philosophy of Conservation and Restoration, honorary member of the ICOMOS International Scientific Committee for Mural Paintings, promoter and founder of Life Beyond Tourism Non Profit Portal, President of Centro Congressi al Duomo - CCAD Firenze affiliate member UNWTO.

Current positions

Biography
Born in Florence, Italy, Paolo Del Bianco graduated at the University of Florence in 1972 with a degree in architecture. In the period 1972–1975 he was assistant professor at the Faculty of Architecture at the University of Florence. He then focused on building construction for the hotel industry. He designed and built hotels and a conference center in Florence, later overseeing their management.

In 1998 he founded the Romualdo Del Bianco Foundation.

In the period  2002–2006 Del Bianco was appointed Associate Professor of the Department of Architecture at the Slovak Technical University of Bratislava (Slovakia).

Biography note

Awards

 1999 Golden medal certified n. 101 from University of Krakow – Politechnica "Tadeusza Košciuszki Bronze medal "Sztuki Piekne Wilno 1797 - 200 lat tradycji wilenskiej" from the Rector of the University of Torun prof. Romuald Drzewiecki
 2000 the Honorary Sign and Membership of the Senate of the Polytechnic of Krakow Tadeusza Kosiuszki
 2002  "Ordre du Mérit Culturel" from the Ministry of Culture of the Republic of Poland
 2004   "Premio Amerigo Vespucci – Ambasciatore ideale della città di Firenze" (Florence, Italy)
 2007 "Il Gonfalone d'Argento" form the Tuscan Region (Italy) "Freedom of the Town of Green Bay, Wisconsin" (USA) Medal 'Honoris Gratiae' from the President of Krakow (Poland) Medal of Honour by the Foundation Sheremyetev (Paris, France) for "the important contribution to the promotion of friendship and cooperation between Italy and Russia"
 2008 Honour "Printer Ivan Fedorov Foundation", by the Foundation Printer Ivan Fedorov Moscow (Russia), for "the important contribution to the promotion of friendship and cooperation between Italy and Russia"
 2009 Medal of recognition by the McKenzie Presbyterian University of São Paulo (Brazil)
 2010 Honorary Certificate from MOOSAO (Russia) Honorary Citizenship of Tbilisi (Georgia)
 2012  Medal of Merit by the Academic Senate of the Nicolaus Copernicus University of Torun
 2013 "Jan Zachwatowicz Award" "for outstanding achievements in research and conservation of monuments" (Poland) "Columbus Prize", Section Culture (Italy) Certificate of Appreciation from the Ivanovo City (Russia) "Award Aleksej Komech" for the co-operation in the promotion of the Russian cultural heritage "National Heritage Award" of the Ministry of Culture and Tourism of the Azerbaijan Republic
 2014 Award "Casa Martelli" Florence (Italy) Honorary Game Ball of the Green Bay Packers - NFL
 2015 Gloria Artis Medal, by the Minister for Culture and National Heritage of Poland, Piotre Zuchowski Medaglia Laurenziana by the Accademia Internazionale Medicea Medal celebrating the 100th Anniversary of the Warsaw Technical University
 2016	Commemorative medal for the 70th Anniversary of the Cracow University of Technology and the Faculty of Architecture

Publications
 HERITAGE for PLANET EARTH-From World HERITAGE Sites for DIALOGUE, to the PLANET EARTH we all share-"Smart Travel, Smart Architecture, Heritage and its Enjoyment for Dialogue" (Florence, 11–13 March 2017), contribution to the Congress HERITAGE for PLANET EARTH® 2017 – 
 Il Modello Life Beyond Tourism®, Sites for Dialogue – Heritage for the Planet©, in "HERITY Wizard's Days-Hypertrophic Tourism" (Venezia, 11 novembre 2016) ; pagg. 56-59;
 Il valore del dialogo per la pace: una testimonianza concreta in Quaderni della Fondazione Ernesto Balducci, Quadrimestrale n.32 - 2016 Immigrazione e politiche di espropriazione ambientale, pagg. 69-78;
 World Heritage Sites for Dialogue – Heritage for Intercultural Dialogue, through Travel – Life Beyond Tourism – Conclusion of the 18th International Assembly of the Experts of the Foundation (Florence, 12–13 March 2016) - Masso Delle Fate Edizioni, Firenze, 2016, 
 Learning Communities for Intercultural Dialogue for Territorial Development – A New Commercial and Educational Offer 'Culture for Dialogue' – 'Travel for Dialogue' Life, Beyond Tourism – publication for the 18th International Assembly of the Experts of the Fondazione Romualdo Del Bianco 2015 Annual Report and Perspectives – Masso delle Fate Edizioni, Firenze – ;
 Learning Communities for Intercultural Dialogue for Territorial Development – A New Commercial and Educational Offer 'Culture for Dialogue' – 'Travel for Dialogue' Life, Beyond Tourism – Slides Book – Masso delle Fate Edizioni, Firenze – ;
 Il motivo della dedica della Sala dell'Auditorium al Duomo a Giuliano Borselli, in "Giuliano Borselli, l'arte dell'amicizia, l'orgoglio della fiorentinità" – Masso delle Fate Edizioni , pagg. 9-12:
 Viaggio, Incontro, Ascolto. Ospitalità Tradizionale, Masso delle Fate Edizioni, ;
 Cultural values for intercultural dialogue in an economy-driven world in " How to assess build heritage? Assumptions, methodologies, examples of heritage assessment systems", by the International Scientific Committee for Theory and Philosophy of Conservation and Restoration ICOMOS, Romualdo Del Bianco Foundation, Lublin Technical University – Florence-Lublin 2015 - Collection: Heritage for Future, pagg. 129-138
 Per il Dialogo tra Culture Un Contributo alla Conoscenza della Diversità delle Espressioni Culturali, Carnevali nel Mondo, prefazione agli Atti del Simposio Internazionale Dialogue Among Cultures. Carnivals in the World, edA Esempi di Architettura 2016 Special Issue, Ermes Edizioni -Scientifiche, pagg. 7-8
 Uscire dal Mondo in Francesco d'Assisi. Padre Ernesto Balducci e la profezia della testimonianza; pagg. 44-56 – Polistampa, Firenze 2015
 Heritage for Intercultural Dialogue, a New Commercial Offer for the Tourism Market with Life Beyond Tourism , proceedings of the 2nd Congress of Polish Conservators "The Past for the Future", Krakow, October 2015;
 Life Beyond Tourism. Heritage for Intercultural Dialogue. Hosting the traveller to promote intercultural dialogue by Paolo Del Bianco, paper presented in the scientific conference "Heritage in Transformation. Heritage Protection in the 21st Century, Problems, Challenges, Predictions" celebrating the 50th Anniversary of ICOMOS, Warsaw, June 2015
 Travel and Hospitality for Intercultural Dialogue – the non profit tourism "LBT Model", 2014 Annual Report and Perspectives for the 17th International Assembly of the Experts of the Fondazione Romualdo Del Bianco – March 2015
 Life Beyond Tourism-travel for dialogue with heritage for sustainable development – Greetings and thanks by Paolo Del Bianco, Booklet in DVD  "Florence 2000 years of history", 18 ICOMOS General Assembly -  - November 2014
 Heritage for Intercultural Dialogue. The Philosophy, the Life Beyond Tourism (LBT) Model and Certified Travel, by Paolo Del Bianco, paper presented during the Scientific Symposium of the 18th General Assembly of ICOMOS "Heritage and Landscape as Human Values" – November 2014
 Florence in the works of world famous people – Encyclopedic Associative Dictionary for guides and tourists - Greetings and thanks by Paolo Del Bianco – 6th edition pag. 5-7 – September 2014
 Il portale no profit Life Beyond Tourism:patrimonio e cultura contemporanea al servizio del dialogo interculturale e dello sviluppo del territorio, di Carlotta Del Bianco, in "Sharing Conservation", del 05/06/2014, p. 204 - 2014
 Life Beyond Tourism®- In viaggio per il dialogo, in Domes and Cupolas - vol.1 – N.2-2014 - - Angelo Pontecorboli Editore ;
 Life Beyond Tourism - In viaggio per il Dialogo Vol I/1, Tipografia Tipolito Pochini  - March 2014
 Firenze - Life Beyond Tourism - In Viaggio per il Dialogo Vol I/2, Tipografia Tipolito Pochini  – March 2014
 L'Arte e il Patrimonio dell'Umanità per il Dialogo fra Culture, in Padre Ernesto Balducci from the "Artists Mass" to Contemporary Art
 Life Beyond Tourism Non Profit Portal and Cultural Community, in The League of Historical Cities Bulletin No. 64, March 2013
 Cultural Heritage for Intercultural Dialogue with Life Beyond Tourism® in Multi-disciplinary Lexicography: Traditions and Challenges of the XXIst Century Edited by Olga M. Karpova and Faina I. Kartashkova (Cambridge Scholars Published, 2013), pp. 246–255
 Incontri, Comunicazione, Conoscenza, Conservazione, Economia. Una piattaforma virtuale per scambi fra teoria e pratica: Portale Non Profit Life Beyond Tourism  / Encounters, Communication, Knowledge, Conservation, Economy. A virtual platform for an osmosis between theory and practice Life Beyond Tourism: Non-profit Portal, in Conservation  Turn - Return To Conservation Tolerance for Change Limits of Change ICOMOS, International Scientific Committee for the Theory and the Philosophy of Conservation and Restoration , (5–9 May 2010, Prague/Cesky Krumlov, Czech Repubvlic 3–6 March 2011, Florence Italy) ed. by  Wilfried Lipp, Josef Stulc, Boguslaw Szmygin, Simone Giometti, Firenze  2012,  pp 129–134, Foreword, Ivi, pp. 7–9
 Life Beyond Tourism: Value Based Heritage Tourism as  an Instrument for Intercultural Dialogue, in Why Does the Past Matter? Changing Visions, Media and Rationales in the 21st Century, Proceedings of the International Conference (May 4–7, 2011, Amherst MA, University of Massachusetts), University of Massachusetts Amherst MA 2011, p. 4
 Presentazione  in  Giovanni Martinelli pittore di Montevarchi, Maestro del Seicento fiorentino, Catalogo della mostra (Montevarchi 19 marzo – 19 giugno 2011)  a cura di Andrea Baldinotti, Bruno Santi, Riccardo Spinelli, "La Città Degli Uffizi.6" Maschietto, Firenze 2011, p. 14
 Preface, in The Caucasus Georgia on the Crossroads. Cultural Exchanges across the Europe and Beyond, Proceedings of the 2nd International Symposium of Georgian Culture (November 2–9, 2009, Florence, Italy), Georgian Arts and Culture Center, Tbilisi 2011, p. 11
 Caucasian Georgia at the Crossroads: Life Beyond Tourism, Ivi, pp. 185–189
 Per non dimenticare, per consentire di conoscere e per ringraziare  in  A. Kadluczka, La piazza principale di Cracovia, il museo sotterraneo e il mercato dei tessuti - I progetti di restauro, di modernizzazione e loro realizzazione, 2002-2010, Archeon, Cracovia 2011,  pp. 6–10
 Presentazione, in Benozzo Gozzoli e Cosimo Rosselli nelle terre di Castelfiorentino. Pittura devozionale in Valdelsa, Catalogo della mostra (Castelfiorentino, 1 maggio-31 luglio 2011), a cura di Serena Nocentini, Anna Padoa Rizzo, "La Città Degli Uffizi"  Maschietto, Firenze 2011, p. 17;
 Presentazione , in  Methodical Approach to the Restoration of Hystoric Architecture, ed. Calogero Bellanca, Alinea Editrice, Firenze 2011 p. 13
 Cultural Heritage for Intercultural Dialogue with Life Beyond Tourism®, in Cultural Heritage for Intercultural Dialogue with Life Beyond Tourism, in The Image of Heritage. Changing Perception, Permanent Responsibilities, Proceedings of the International Conference of the ICOMOS. International Scientific Committee for the Theory and the Philosophy of Conservation and Restoration (6–8 March 2009 Florence, Italy), ed. by Andrzej Tomaszewski, Simone Giometti, Polistampa, Firenze 2011, pp. 37; 
 Life Beyond Tourism , in La cultura umanistica e tecnica per la conservazione degli edifici storici e monumentali, Bollettino ingegneri, n.1-2, 2010, pp. 4–6 - 
 Presentazione  in Beato Angelico a Pontassieve, Dipinti e sculture del Rinascimento Fiorentino, Catalogo della mostra (Pontassieve28 febbraio – 27 giugno 2010) a cura di Ada Labriola, "La Città Degli Uffizi.3"  Mandragora, Firenze 2010, p. 12-13
 Presentazione, in  Ghirlandaio Una famiglia di pittori del Rinascimento tra Firenze e Scandicci, Catalogo della mostra (Scandicci 21 novembre 2010-1 maggio 2011) a cura di Annamaria Bernacchioni, "La Città Degli Uffizi.5", Polistampa, Firenze 2010, p. 17
 Le Farfalle della Fondazione Romualdo Del Bianco, in Dipingere le farfalle Giove, Mercurio e la virtù di Dosso Dossi: Un elogio dell'otium e della pittura per Alfonso I D'Este, a cura di Vincenzo Farinella, Editore Polistampa, Firenze 2011, pp. 7–10; 
 Life Beyond Tourism, in Florence in the Work of European Writers and Artists: Encyclopaedic Dictionary for Guides and Tourists. Project of a Dictionary, ed. by Olga Karpova, Ivanova State University, Ivanovo 2010
 Presentazione,  in Arte a Figline. Dal Maestro della Maddalena a Masaccio,  Catalogo della mostra (Figline Valdarno 16 ottobre 2010 – 16 gennaio 2011) a cura di Angelo Tartuferi, "La Città Degli Uffizi.4"  Polistampa, Firenze 2010, p. 18-19 - 
 Presentazione,  in  L'Oratorio di Santa Caterina all'Antella e i suoi pittori, Catalogo della mostra (Ponte an Ema  Bagno a Ripoli 19 settembre  – 31 dicembre  2009) a cura di Angelo Tartuferi, "La Città Degli Uffizi.2"  Mandragora,  Firenze 2009, p. 11 - 
 Life Beyond Tourism, in Florence in the Work of European Writers and Artists: Encyclopaedic Dictionary for Guides and Tourists. Project of a Dictionary, ed. by Olga Karpova, Ivanova State University, Ivanovo 2009, p. 6
 Presentazione,  in  il Cigoli e i suoi amici, colorire naturale e vero, Catalogo della mostra (Figline Valdarno 18 ottobre 2008- 18 gennaio 2009) a cura di Novella Barbolani di Montauto, Miles Chappell, "La Città Degli Uffizi.1"  Polistampa, Firenze 2008, p. 11
 Preface,  in Conservation and Preservation. Interactions between Theory and Practice In memoriam Alois Riegl (1858 - 1905). Proceedings of the International Conference of the ICOMOS International Scientific Committee for the Theory and the Philosophy of Conservation and Restoration,(23–27 April 2008 Vienna, Austria) ed. by Michael S. Falser, Wilfried Lipp, Andrzej Tomaszewski  p. 9-10;
 The 21st century and the historical Islamic city, in XXI Century: Historic Islamic Cities. International Conference (Baku, November 20–21, 2007)  Baku  2008,  pp. 11–14 - 
 Greetings and Auspices, in Values and Criteria in Heritage Conservation Proceedings of the International Conference of ICOMOS, ICCROM and Fondazione Romualdo Del Bianco, (2–4 March 2007 Florence)  Polistampa, Firenze 2008, pp. 11–19 - 
 Life Beyond Tourism, in Florence in the Work of European Writers and Artists: Encyclopaedic Dictionary for Guides and Tourists. Project of a Dictionary, ed. by Olga Karpova, Ivanova State University, Ivanovo 2008
 2006 Cracow - Cultural Heritage in the 21st Century Opportunities and Challenges - Recovery and Restoration of the Values of Socialisation - International Cultural Centre 
 Historical Heritage and Cross Cultural Communication, in  Interdisciplinary co-operation for the sustainable development of historical cities and protected areas Perspectives of a sound tourism, Proceedings of the 11th International Conference EURO-ECO 2006 (Krakow, 18–19 September 2006), ed. by Alexandra Wagner, Jan Dobrowolski, Hard Publishing Company, Krakow 2006,  p. 27
 Premessa,  in  A Firenze con i viaggiatori e i residenti polacchi / Florencja Polskich podroznikow  i mieszkancow / Polish travellers and residents in Florence , a cura di Luca Bernardini,"Travellers",  Nardini,  Firenze 2005, pp. 7–9

Private life
He is married with Giovanna, father of three adult daughters, two of which are active in the Fondazione.

Acknowledgements
For his activity as President of the Foundation, he received Honorary Doctorate Degrees from the Azerbaijan State University (Azerbaijan), the Yerevan State University (Armenia), the University of Wisconsin Green Bay (United States), the Tbilisi State University (Georgia), the Tbilisi State Academy of Arts (Georgia) and the Moscow Architectural Institute-MARHI (Russia).  He also received Honorary Professorships from the Ivanovo State University (Russia), the Kharkiv State Technical University (Ukraine), and the Higher School for Civil Engineering in Moscow (Russia). He is an Honorary Member of the Senate of the "Tadeusz Kościuszko" Technical University of Krakow (Poland), an Honorary Member of the Union of Architects of Belarus and a Professor of the International Academy of Architecture-Branch of Moscow (MAAM).

He also received the "Ordre du Mérit Culturel" from the Ministry of Culture of the Republic of Poland, the "Gonfalone d'Argento" form the Tuscan Region (Italy), the "Premio Amerigo Vespucci – Ambasciatore ideale della città di Firenze"(Italy), the "Freedom of the Town of Green Bay, Wisconsin" (USA), the Medal 'Honoris Gratiae' from the President of Krakow, Poland, the Honorary Citizenship of Tbilisi (Georgia).

References

External links
 Fondazione-delbianco.org
 Lifebeyondtourism.org

Living people
1945 births
20th-century Italian architects
Architects from Florence